The ceremonial first pitch is a longstanding ritual of baseball in which a guest of honor throws a ball to mark the end of pregame festivities and the start of the game. Originally, the guest threw a ball from their seat in the grandstand to the pitcher or catcher of the home team, but the ritual changed after United States President Ronald Reagan threw the first pitch on the field at an unscheduled appearance at a Baltimore Orioles game. Now, the guest stands in front of the pitcher's mound and throws towards home plate. The ceremonial thrower sometimes stands on the mound (as a pitcher would). The recipient of the pitch is usually a player from the home team.

The ceremonial thrower may be a notable person (dignitary, celebrity, former player, etc.) who is in attendance, an executive from a company that sponsors the team (especially when that company has sponsored that night's promotional giveaway), or a person who won the first pitch opportunity as a contest prize. Often, especially in the minor leagues, multiple first pitches are made.

The practice of having ceremonial first pitches dates back to at least 1890, when throwers were often a mayor, governor, or other locally notable individual. Ohio Governor (and future U.S. president) William McKinley, for example, "threw the ball into the diamond" before an opening day game between Toledo and Columbus in 1892. Former Japanese Prime Minister Ōkuma Shigenobu threw out the ceremonial first pitch at the first game of an American All-Star team's tour of Japan in 1908, making him possibly the first person who had served as a national head of government to throw out a first pitch.

Ceremonial first pitches during the World Series are subject to the Commissioner of Baseball's approval. Section 7.13 of the World Series Manual states, "All first‐ball throwers are subject to final approval of the commissioner. Recommendations are solicited from the participating clubs, but no commitments should be made until approval has been received. The use of politicians, movie stars, etc., will not be approved except in rare or unusual circumstances." Baltimore Orioles owner Jerold Hoffberger was fined $2,500 for allowing Maryland Governor Harry Hughes to throw out the first pitch before Game 2 of the 1979 World Series over the objections of Commissioner Bowie Kuhn.

On April 23, 2012, the Texas Rangers executed a unique twist on the first pitch tradition. Before the Rangers' home game against the New York Yankees, the team held an official retirement ceremony for longtime catcher Iván Rodríguez. Instead of going to the pitcher's mound, he went behind home plate and threw the first "pitch" to longtime teammate Michael Young, who was standing at second base.

On July 23, 2020, Dr. Anthony Fauci, director of the National Institute of Allergy and Infectious Diseases, threw the first pitch of the 2020 MLB season after it was delayed due to the COVID-19 pandemic.

Presidential first pitches

The American tradition of presidential first pitches began in 1910, when United States President William Howard Taft threw the ceremonial first pitch at the Washington Senators' Opening Day at Griffith Stadium. Every president since, with the exceptions of Donald Trump and Joe Biden (who has yet to do so during his current presidential term) has thrown out at least one ceremonial first pitch during or after their presidency, either for Opening Day, the All-Star Game, or the World Series, usually with much fanfare.

President Franklin D. Roosevelt has thrown the most presidential first pitches while in office at 11, while President George W. Bush has thrown 14 first pitches overall, including those thrown before and after holding the office. Donald Trump and Jimmy Carter are the only presidents to not throw a ceremonial first pitch for an Opening Day during their presidency, though the latter did so after he left office.

See also 

 Ceremonial first puck, a similar ritual of ice hockey

References

External links

Baseball culture
Baseball terminology
Politics and sports
Washington Nationals